The South Omaha Main Street Historic District is located along South 24th Street between M and O Streets in South Omaha, Nebraska. It was added to the National Register of Historic Places in 1989. Home to dozens of historically important buildings, including the Packer's National Bank Building, the historic district includes  and more than 32 buildings.

About 
The site of a historically vital commercial district in the History of Omaha, the South Omaha Main Street Historic District once comprised the urban core of the City of South Omaha, Nebraska. It includes businesses, the former South Omaha City Hall, a correctional facility, banks, a post office, professional offices, and specialty stores.

Renowned for its cultural influences, including the historic location of Omaha's Greek, Russian, Polish and Czech immigrant communities, as well as the city's current growing Latino community, including Mexicans.

Contributing properties 
The Carpenter Building is one such building in the South Omaha Main Street Historic District, built in 1916 as a one-story brick structure. The building housed a hardware store, until a fire in 1988. A rehabilitation in 1990 allowed the building to continue being used. Packer's National Bank Building was listed on the National Register of Historic Places in 1985. Founded in 1891, the bank served employees of the Union Stock Yards Company of Omaha and the associated meat packing industry in South Omaha.

The Vanous Block, built in 1892, is a three-story contributing property for the district that was originally a warehouse. A 1992 rehabilitation converted it into a commercial and rental residential space. The Stockman Publishing Company building is a two-story building constructed in 1890 that was converted to office and residential space in 1992. The Brandes Block is a three-story brick building that was built in 1889. The building was converted to a mixed commercial and rental residential use in 1991. The Roseland Theater, built in the 1920s, was a theater through the mid-1980s. In 1991 the building was converted into commercial and rental residential use. The Commercial Building is a one-story brick building that was originally a livestock supply dealership. The building was converted to retail and warehouse space in 1994.

Notable locations

See also
 History of Omaha, Nebraska
 North 24th Street

External links

Modern photo of the South Omaha Main Street Historic District. 
South Omaha: Omaha's Mercado. South Omaha Business Association website.

References

History of South Omaha, Nebraska
National Register of Historic Places in Omaha, Nebraska
Historic districts in Omaha, Nebraska
Landmarks in South Omaha, Nebraska
Neighborhoods in South Omaha, Nebraska
Ethnic enclaves in the United States
Meatpacking industry in Omaha, Nebraska
Historic districts on the National Register of Historic Places in Nebraska